Boy Meets Girls was a UK popular music TV show which was launched in September 1959 replacing the earlier show Oh Boy!.

The show was presented and produced by Jack Good.  Marty Wilde was the principal resident male artist and The Vernons Girls were the female residents. Joe Brown made regular appearances. Other artists appearing included Terry Dene, Freddy Cannon, Little Tony & His Brothers, Adam Faith and Cliff Richard.

The director was Rita Gillespie for ABC Weekend TV, part of the ITV network.

The programme ended in 1960; all 26 episodes were subsequently wiped, and none survive in ITV's archive as of 2020.

References
Whirligig TV The TV Rock n' Roll Years . Retrieved February 2008
 Accessed February 2008
Sixties City Boy Meets Girl( ABC Television ) 1959–1960 . Retrieved February 2008

External links 
 

1950s British music television series
1959 British television series debuts
1960 British television series endings
Television shows produced by ABC Weekend TV
1960s British music television series